Paul G. Boyd (September 30, 1967 – August 13, 2007) was an American-born Canadian animator. He was a member of a.k.a. Cartoon, the production team for Cartoon Network's Ed, Edd, and Eddy, as a title sequence animator and director. He began his career working for International Rocketship on two Gary Larson specials. During his career he taught at Vancouver Film School and worked at many animation studios in Vancouver. His work directing for Aaagh! It's the Mr. Hell Show!, along with co-director Moose Pagen, was nominated for an Annie Award in 2001.

Early history
Boyd was born September 30, 1967 in Pasadena, California. He grew up in the west side of Vancouver, British Columbia and attended Lord Byng Secondary School. He attended University of British Columbia and Concordia University in Montreal.  Before joining a.k.a. Cartoon, he showed an unusual gift for expression in the visual arts in his youth.  For the last 15 years of his life, he had a successful career as an animator, and was employed by a number of animation studios in Vancouver. He was passionate about his work and it was highly regarded.

Career
According to the animation industry website Cartoon Brew, other than Ed, Edd, and Eddy, Boyd also worked for Aaagh! It's the Mr. Hell Show! and provided animation for Gary Larson's Tales from the Far Side and the Flash animation television series ¡Mucha Lucha!  An incomplete list of his animation credits can be found on IMDb.  During the 1990s he taught many young animators at the Vancouver Film School.  A prize in his honour for the top student in Classical Animation at the Vancouver Film School is funded by his family and presented three times per year.  At the time of Boyd's death he was working at the Global Mechanic studio.  His last completed work was on two animated advertisements for the Alberta Government.

Illness and death
While in his 20s, Boyd was diagnosed with bipolar disorder, an illness for which he received constant and usually effective treatment.  He lived with this illness for almost 20 years. He was shot and killed on August 13, 2007, by a police officer, Lee Chipperfield, in Vancouver. A video recorded by tourists showed Boyd being shot nine times after wielding what was believed to be a bicycle chain, but other witnesses state it was a chain of paperclips, at officers who came to respond to a disturbance involving him. The ninth shot that struck Boyd was fired as he was on the ground. The officer who shot Boyd was cleared in the death. The use of force was criticized by many of Boyd's colleagues and relatives.

Investigation
The fatal shooting incident was investigated by the Vancouver Police Department and their findings passed on to the Criminal Justice Branch of BC which decided not to prosecute Chipperfield.   After a Coroner's Inquest in December 2010 revealed many details which did not figure in the Criminal Justice Branch report, a complaint was filed by the British Columbia Civil Liberties Association to the Office of the Police Complaints Commissioner alleging that excessive force had been used. In March 2012, the British Columbia Police Complaint Commissioner issued a report concluding that there was not "clear, convincing and cogent evidence ... that Chipperfield used unnecessary force or excessive force during this incident."  He based his conclusion partly on an opinion provided by a use-of-force expert, Bill Lewinski, who suggested that Chipperfield could have been suffering from "inattentional blindness."

In May 2012, a video captured by a tourist's video camera surfaced.  In the video, which starts just as a burst of two shots was fired (the 7th and 8th shots), Boyd is seen crawling on the road, unarmed.  In the time between the eighth and ninth (fatal) shot, an officer is seen standing near Boyd handling an object that analysis of the video showed to be a chain and throwing it to one side thus providing evidence that Boyd was unarmed at the time the fatal shot was fired.  David Eby, executive director of the B. C. Civil Liberties Association, said that the video made it clear that Boyd did not pose a threat to anyone at the time the fatal bullet was fired.  In light of the new evidence, an independent investigative agency, the Alberta Serious Incident Response Team (ASIRT), was asked by the Attorney General of British Columbia to review the case with the new video in consideration.

In a June 25, 2013 media statement, the Criminal Justice Branch announced that ASIRT had completed its investigation and on June 24, 2013, the Assistant Deputy Attorney General, M. Joyce DeWitt-Van Oosten, had appointed a prominent Vancouver lawyer, Mark Jetté, as special prosecutor to decide on the basis of ASIRT's report and further investigation, if necessary, if charges would be laid against any of the officers involved in the incident. If a decision were made to prosecute then Mr. Jetté would conduct the prosecution. Ms DeWitt-Van Oosten concluded that it was necessary to appoint a Special Prosecutor to avoid any potential for real or perceived improper influence in the administration of criminal justice in reviewing the ASIRT report.  The BCCLA applauded the B.C. government for their June 2013 decision to appoint a Special Prosecutor to reconsider laying charges in the Boyd case.
  (In December 2010, following the conclusion of the Coroner's Inquest, the British Columbia Civil Liberties Association had called for a Special Prosecutor to be appointed but this request was rejected at that time).

On October 28, 2013, the Criminal Justice Branch announced that the special prosecutor had decided that no charges would be laid against Chipperfield in this case.  Because the intent of Chipperfield's actions, i.e. to shoot and kill Boyd, was not in dispute the only charge that would have been appropriate was one of second degree murder.  However, the prosecutor reasoned that the defense of self-defense would likely succeed because of the requirement that the prosecution establish beyond a reasonable doubt that Chipperfield knew he was shooting an unarmed and severely wounded man who did not pose a threat of death or serious injury to Chipperfield or others.  Some of the police officers and civilian witnesses present at the time of the fatal shot testified that Boyd was crawling at the time he was killed and did not present a threat to any other person.  Others testified that although he was crawling he did present a threat, and still others said that he was walking and upright up until the final shot. There was similar differing testimony regarding whether or not he was armed.  While the video may support some of these testimonies more than others, as a whole they could be used by the defence to attempt to establish that a reasonable person could believe that Boyd posed a threat at the time of his death.  For a discussion of the meaning of "reasonable doubt", see:, where there is an extensive section concerning the meaning of the term in Canadian criminal law as interpreted by the Supreme Court of Canada.

Memorial
The Ed, Edd, and Eddy episode, May I Have This Ed? / Look Before You Ed!, was dedicated in Boyd's memory, and features a memorial at the end of the episode stating, Paul Boyd 1967-2007. We will miss you, big lug!

References

External links

Interview with Boyd's sister, Deborah

1967 births
2007 deaths
Artists from Pasadena, California
Artists from Vancouver
Animators from California
American emigrants to Canada
Canadian animators
Concordia University alumni
People shot dead by law enforcement officers in Canada
People with bipolar disorder
Killings by law enforcement officers in Canada
University of British Columbia alumni
Academic staff of the Vancouver Film School
Filmed killings by law enforcement